Asteroid mining is the hypothetical exploitation of materials from asteroids and other minor planets, including near-Earth objects.

Notable asteroid mining challenges include the high cost of spaceflight, unreliable identification of asteroids which are suitable for mining, and the challenges of extracting usable material in a space environment.

Asteroid sample return research missions, such as Hayabusa, Hayabusa2, and in-progress OSIRIS-REx illustrate the challenges of collecting ore from space using current technology. As of 2023, less than 7 grams of asteroid material has been successfully returned to Earth from space. In progress missions promise to increase this amount to approximately 60 grams (two ounces). Asteroid research missions are complex endeavors and return a tiny amount of material (less than 1 milligram Hayabusa, 100 milligrams Hayabusa2, 60 grams planned OSIRIS-REx) relative to the size and expense of these projects ($300 million Hayabusa, $800 million Hayabusa2, $1.16 billion OSIRIS-REx).

After a burst of interest in the 2010s, asteroid mining ambitions have shifted to more distant long-term goals and some 'asteroid mining' companies have pivoted to more general-purpose propulsion technology.

The history of asteroid mining is brief but features a gradual development. Ideas of which asteroids to prospect, how to gather resources, and what to do with those resources evolve over the decades.

History

Prior to 1970 
Before 1970, asteroid mining existed largely within the realm of science fiction. Stories such as Worlds of If, Scavengers in Space, and Miners in the Sky told stories about the conceived dangers, motives, and experiences of mining asteroids. At the same time, many researchers in academia speculated about the profits that could be gained from asteroid mining, but they lacked the technology to seriously pursue the idea.

The 1970s 
The 1969 Moon Landing spurred a wave of scientific interest in human space activity far beyond the Earth's orbit. As the decade continued, more and more academic interest surrounded the topic of asteroid mining. A good deal of serious academic consideration was aimed at mining asteroids located closer to Earth than the main asteroid belt. In particular, the asteroid groups Apollo and Amor were considered. These groups were chosen not only because of their proximity to Earth but also because many at the time thought they were rich in raw materials that could be refined.

Despite the wave of interest, many in the space science community were aware of how little was known about asteroids and encouraged a more gradual and systematic approach to asteroid mining.

The 1980s 
Academic interest in asteroid mining continued into the 1980s. The idea of targeting the Apollo and Amor asteroid groups still had some popularity. However, by the late 1980s the interest in the Apollo and Amor asteroid groups is being replaced with interest in the moons of Mars, Phobos and Deimos.

Organizations like NASA begin to formulate ideas of how to process materials in space and what to do with the materials that are hypothetically gathered from space.

The 1990s 

New reasons emerge for pursuing asteroid mining. These reasons tend to revolve around environmental concerns, such as fears over humans over-consuming the Earth's natural resources and trying to capture energy from the Sun in space.

In the same decade, NASA is trying to establish what materials in asteroids could be valuable for extraction. These materials include free-metals, volatiles, and bulk dirt.

Minerals in space 

As resource depletion on Earth becomes more real, the idea of extracting valuable elements from asteroids and returning these to Earth for profit, or using space-based resources to build solar-power satellites and space habitats, becomes more attractive.  Hypothetically, water processed from ice could refuel orbiting propellant depots.

Although asteroids and Earth accreted from the same starting materials, Earth's relatively stronger gravity pulled all heavy siderophilic (iron-loving) elements into its core during its molten youth more than four billion years ago. This left the crust depleted of such valuable elements until a rain of asteroid impacts re-infused the depleted crust with metals like gold, cobalt, iron, manganese, molybdenum, nickel, osmium, palladium, platinum, rhenium, rhodium, ruthenium and tungsten (some flow from core to surface does occur, e.g. at the Bushveld Igneous Complex, a famously rich source of platinum-group metals). Today, these metals are mined from Earth's crust, and they are essential for economic and technological progress. Hence, the geologic history of Earth may very well set the stage for a future of asteroid mining.

In 2006, the Keck Observatory announced that the binary Jupiter trojan 617 Patroclus, and possibly large numbers of other Jupiter trojans, are likely extinct comets and consist largely of water ice. Similarly, Jupiter-family comets, and possibly near-Earth asteroids that are extinct comets, might also provide water. The process of in-situ resource utilization—using materials native to space for propellant, thermal management, tankage, radiation shielding, and other high-mass components of space infrastructure—could lead to radical reductions in its cost.  Although whether these cost reductions could be achieved, and if achieved would offset the enormous infrastructure investment required, is unknown.

From the astrobiological perspective, asteroid prospecting could provide scientific data for the search for extraterrestrial intelligence (SETI). Some astrophysicists have suggested that if advanced extraterrestrial civilizations employed asteroid mining long ago, the hallmarks of these activities might be detectable.

An important factor to consider in target selection is orbital economics, in particular the change in velocity (Δv) and travel time to and from the target. More of the extracted native material must be expended as propellant in higher Δv trajectories, thus less returned as payload. Direct Hohmann trajectories are faster than Hohmann trajectories assisted by planetary and/or lunar flybys, which in turn are faster than those of the Interplanetary Transport Network, but the reduction in transfer time comes at the cost of increased Δv requirements.

The Easily Recoverable Object (ERO) subclass of Near-Earth asteroids are considered likely candidates for early mining activity. Their low Δv makes them suitable for use in extracting construction materials for near-Earth space-based facilities, greatly reducing the economic cost of transporting supplies into Earth orbit.

The table above shows a comparison of Δv requirements for various missions. In terms of propulsion energy requirements, a mission to a near-Earth asteroid compares favorably to alternative mining missions.

An example of a potential target for an early asteroid mining expedition is 4660 Nereus, expected to be mainly enstatite. This body has a very low Δv compared to lifting materials from the surface of the Moon. However, it would require a much longer round-trip to return the material.

Multiple types of asteroids have been identified but the three main types would include the C-type, S-type, and M-type asteroids:

 C-type asteroids have a high abundance of water which is not currently of use for mining but could be used in an exploration effort beyond the asteroid. Mission costs could be reduced by using the available water from the asteroid. C-type asteroids also have high amounts of organic carbon, phosphorus, and other key ingredients for fertilizer which could be used to grow food.
 S-type asteroids carry little water but are more attractive because they contain numerous metals, including nickel, cobalt, and more valuable metals, such as gold, platinum, and rhodium.
 M-type asteroids are rare but contain up to 10 times more metal than S-types.

A class of easily retrievable objects (EROs) was identified by a group of researchers in 2013. Twelve asteroids made up the initially identified group, all of which could be potentially mined with present-day rocket technology.

Asteroid cataloging 

The B612 Foundation is a private nonprofit foundation with headquarters in the United States, dedicated to protecting Earth from asteroid strikes. As a non-governmental organization it has conducted two lines of related research to help detect asteroids that could one day strike Earth, and find the technological means to divert their path to avoid such collisions.

The foundation's 2013 goal was to design and build a privately financed asteroid-finding space telescope, Sentinel, hoping in 2013 to launch it in 2017–2018. After NASA terminated their $30 million funding agreement with the B612 Foundation in October 2015 and the private fundraising did not achieve its goals, the Foundation eventually opted for an alternative approach using a constellation of much smaller spacecraft which is under study . NASA/JPL's NEOCam has been proposed instead.

Mining considerations 

There are four options for mining:
 In-space manufacturing (ISM), which may be enabled by biomining.
 Bring raw asteroidal material to Earth for use.
 Process it on-site to bring back only processed materials, and perhaps produce propellant for the return trip.
 Transport the asteroid to a safe orbit around the Moon or Earth or to the ISS. This can hypothetically allow for most materials to be used and not wasted.

Processing in situ for the purpose of extracting high-value minerals will reduce the energy requirements for transporting the materials, although the processing facilities must first be transported to the mining site. In situ mining will involve drilling boreholes and injecting hot fluid/gas and allow the useful material to react or melt with the solvent and extract the solute. Due to the weak gravitational fields of asteroids, any activities, like drilling, will cause large disturbances and form dust clouds. These might be confined by some dome or bubble barrier. Or else some means of rapidly dissipating any dust could be provided for.

Mining operations require special equipment to handle the extraction and processing of ore in outer space.
The machinery will need to be anchored to the body, but once in place, the ore can be moved about more readily due to the lack of gravity. However, no techniques for refining ore in zero gravity currently exist. Docking with an asteroid might be performed using a harpoon-like process, where a projectile would penetrate the surface to serve as an anchor; then an attached cable would be used to winch the vehicle to the surface, if the asteroid is both penetrable and rigid enough for a harpoon to be effective.

Due to the distance from Earth to an asteroid selected for mining, the round-trip time for communications will be several minutes or more, except during occasional close approaches to Earth by near-Earth asteroids. Thus any mining equipment will either need to be highly automated, or a human presence will be needed nearby. Humans would also be useful for troubleshooting problems and for maintaining the equipment. On the other hand, multi-minute communications delays have not prevented the success of robotic exploration of Mars, and automated systems would be much less expensive to build and deploy.

Failed mining projects

On April 24, 2012, a plan was announced by billionaire entrepreneurs to mine asteroids for their resources. The company was called Planetary Resources and its founders include aerospace entrepreneurs Eric Anderson and Peter Diamandis. Advisers included film director and explorer James Cameron and investors included Google's chief executive Larry Page. Its executive chairman was Eric Schmidt. They planned to create a fuel depot in space by 2020 by using water from asteroids, splitting it to liquid oxygen and liquid hydrogen for rocket fuel. From there, it could be shipped to Earth orbit for refueling commercial satellites or spacecraft. In 2020, the scheme was wound down and all hardware assets were auctioned off.

Telescope technology was proposed by Planetary Resources to locate and harvest these asteroids has resulted in the plans for three different types of satellites:
 Arkyd Series 100 (the Leo Space telescope) is a less expensive instrument that will be used to find, analyze, and see what resources are available on nearby asteroids.
 Arkyd Series 200 (the Interceptor) Satellite that would actually land on the asteroid to get a closer analysis of the available resources.
 Arkyd Series 300 (Rendezvous Prospector) Satellite developed for research and finding resources deeper in space.

In 2018, all plans for The Arkyd space telescope technology were abandoned, and Planetary Resources assets were acquired ConsenSys, a blockchain company with no public space facing goals.

Deep Space Industries, was started in 2013 by David Gump, who had founded other space companies. At the time, the company hoped to begin prospecting for asteroids suitable for mining by 2015 and by 2016 return asteroid samples to Earth. Deep Space Industries planned to begin mining by 2023. Deep Space Industries sold water thrusters, and in 2019 was acquired by Bradford Space, a company focusing on earth orbit systems and space flight components.

Proposed mining projects

At ISDC-San Diego 2013, Kepler Energy and Space Engineering (KESE, llc) also announced it was going to mine asteroids, using a simpler, more straightforward approach: KESE plans to use almost exclusively existing guidance, navigation and anchoring technologies from mostly successful missions like the Rosetta/Philae, Dawn, and Hayabusa, and current NASA Technology Transfer tooling to build and send a 4-module Automated Mining System (AMS) to a small asteroid with a simple digging tool to collect ≈40 tons of asteroid regolith and bring each of the four return modules back to low Earth orbit (LEO) by the end of the decade. Small asteroids are expected to be loose piles of rubble, therefore providing for easy extraction.

In September 2012, the NASA Institute for Advanced Concepts (NIAC) announced the Robotic Asteroid Prospector project, which will examine and evaluate the feasibility of asteroid mining in terms of means, methods, and systems.

Technology is being developed by TransAstra Corporation to locate and harvest asteroids with the Apis family of spacecraft, which comprises three classes of flight systems:
 Mini Bee is an experimental technology demonstration vehicle designed to showcase the company's patented approach to asteroid mining using concentrated solar energy known as optical mining
 Honey Bee is a mid-sized spacecraft designed to utilize optical mining technology to harvest asteroids up to 10 meters in average diameter
 Queen Bee is the largest spacecraft in the Apis family, an evolution of the Honey Bee that is scaled to enable capture and mining of asteroids up to 40 meters in average diameter

Economics 

Currently, the quality of the ore and the consequent cost and mass of equipment required to extract it are unknown and can only be speculated. Some economic analyses indicate that the cost of returning asteroidal materials to Earth far outweighs their market value, and that asteroid mining will not attract private investment at current commodity prices and space transportation costs. Other studies suggest large profit by using solar power. Potential markets for materials can be identified and profit generated if extraction cost is brought down. For example, the delivery of multiple tonnes of water to low Earth orbit for rocket fuel preparation for space tourism could generate a significant profit if space tourism itself proves profitable.

In 1997 it was speculated that a relatively small metallic asteroid with a diameter of  contains more than US$20 trillion worth of industrial and precious metals. A comparatively small M-type asteroid with a mean diameter of  could contain more than two billion metric tons of iron–nickel ore, or two to three times the world production of 2004. The asteroid 16 Psyche is believed to contain  of nickel–iron, which could supply the world production requirement for several million years. A small portion of the extracted material would also be precious metals.

Not all mined materials from asteroids would be cost-effective, especially for the potential return of economic amounts of material to Earth. For potential return to Earth, platinum is considered very rare in terrestrial geologic formations and therefore is potentially worth bringing some quantity for terrestrial use. Nickel, on the other hand, is quite abundant and being mined in many terrestrial locations, so the high cost of asteroid mining may not make it economically viable.

Although Planetary Resources indicated in 2012 that the platinum from a  asteroid could be worth US$25–50 billion, an economist remarked any outside source of precious metals could lower prices sufficiently to possibly doom the venture by rapidly increasing the available supply of such metals.

Development of an infrastructure for altering asteroid orbits could offer a large return on investment.

Scarcity 

Scarcity is a fundamental economic problem of humans having seemingly unlimited wants in a world of limited resources. Since Earth's resources are finite, the relative abundance of asteroidal ore gives asteroid mining the potential to provide nearly unlimited resources, which would essentially eliminate scarcity for those materials.

The idea of exhausting resources is not new. In 1798, Thomas Malthus wrote, because resources are ultimately limited, the exponential growth in a population would result in falls in income per capita until poverty and starvation would result as a constricting factor on population. Malthus posited this  years ago, and no sign has yet emerged of the Malthus effect regarding raw materials.
 Proven reserves are deposits of mineral resources that are already discovered and known to be economically extractable under present or similar demand, price and other economic and technological conditions.
 Conditional reserves are discovered deposits that are not yet economically viable.
 Indicated reserves are less intensively measured deposits whose data is derived from surveys and geological projections. Hypothetical reserves and speculative resources make up this group of reserves.
 Inferred reserves are deposits that have been located but not yet exploited.

Continued development in asteroid mining techniques and technology will help to increase mineral discoveries. As the cost of extracting mineral resources, especially platinum group metals, on Earth rises, the cost of extracting the same resources from celestial bodies declines due to technological innovations around space exploration.

, there are 711 known asteroids with a value exceeding US$100 trillion.

Financial feasibility 

Space ventures are high-risk, with long lead times and heavy capital investment, and that is no different for asteroid-mining projects. These types of ventures could be funded through private investment or through government investment. For a commercial venture it can be profitable as long as the revenue earned is greater than total costs (costs for extraction and costs for marketing). The costs involving an asteroid-mining venture have been estimated to be around US$100 billion in 1996.

There are six categories of cost considered for an asteroid mining venture:
 Research and development costs
 Exploration and prospecting costs
 Construction and infrastructure development costs
 Operational and engineering costs
 Environmental costs
 Time cost

Determining financial feasibility is best represented through net present value. One requirement needed for financial feasibility is a high return on investments estimating around 30%. Example calculation assumes for simplicity that the only valuable material on asteroids is platinum. On August 16, 2016, platinum was valued at $1157 per ounce or $37,000 per kilogram. At a price of $1,340, for a 10% return on investment,  of platinum would have to be extracted for every 1,155,000 tons of asteroid ore. For a 50% return on investment  of platinum would have to be extracted for every 11,350,000 tons of asteroid ore. This analysis assumes that doubling the supply of platinum to the market (5.13 million ounces in 2014) would have no effect on the price of platinum. A more realistic assumption is that increasing the supply by this amount would reduce the price 30–50%.

The financial feasibility of asteroid mining with regards to different technical parameters has been presented by Sonter and more recently by Hein et al.

Hein et al. have specifically explored the case where platinum is brought from space to Earth and estimate that economically viable asteroid mining for this specific case would be rather challenging.

Decreases in the price of space access matter.  The start of operational use of the low-cost-per-kilogram-in-orbit Falcon Heavy launch vehicle in 2018 is projected by astronomer Martin Elvis to have increased the extent of economically minable near-Earth asteroids from hundreds to thousands.  With the increased availability of several kilometers per second of delta-v that Falcon Heavy provides, it increases the number of NEAs accessible from 3 percent to around 45 percent.

Precedent for joint investment by multiple parties into a long-term venture to mine commodities may be found in the legal concept of a mining partnership, which exists in the state laws of multiple US states including California.  In a mining partnership, "[Each] member of a mining partnership shares in the profits and losses thereof in the proportion which the interest or share he or she owns in the mine bears to the whole partnership capital or whole number of shares."

Mining the Asteroid Belt from Mars

Since Mars is much closer to the Asteroid belt than Earth is, it would take less Delta-v to get to the Asteroid belt and return minerals to Mars.  One hypothesis is that the origin of the Moons of Mars (Phobos and Deimos) are actually Asteroid captures from the Asteroid belt. 16 Psyche in the main belt could have over $10,000 Quadrillion Dollars worth of minerals.  NASA is planning a mission for October 10, 2023 for the Psyche orbiter to launch and get to the asteroid by August 2029 to study. 511 Davida could have $27 quadrillion Dollars worth of minerals and resources. Using the moon Phobos to launch spacecraft is energetically favorable and a useful location from which to dispatch missions to main belt asteroids. Mining the asteroid belt from Mars and its moons could help in the Colonization of Mars.

Phobos as a space elevator for Mars

Phobos is synchronously orbiting Mars, where the same face stays facing the planet at ~6,028 km above the Martian surface.  A space elevator could extend down from Phobos to Mars 6,000 km, about 28 kilometers from the surface, and just out of the atmosphere of Mars. A similar space elevator cable could extend out 6,000 km the opposite direction that would counterbalance Phobos.  In total the space elevator would extend out over 12,000 km which would be below Areostationary orbit of Mars (17,032 km). A rocket launch would still be needed to get the rocket and cargo to the beginning of the space elevator 28 km above the surface.  The surface of Mars is rotating at 0.25 km/s at the equator and the bottom of the space elevator would be rotating around Mars at 0.77 km/s, so only 0.52 km/s of Delta-v would be needed to get to the space elevator. Phobos orbits at 2.15 km/s and the outer most part of the space elevator would rotate around Mars at 3.52 km/s.

Regulation and safety 
Space law involves a specific set of international treaties, along with national statutory laws. The system and framework for international and domestic laws have emerged in part through the United Nations Office for Outer Space Affairs. The rules, terms and agreements that space law authorities consider to be part of the active body of international space law are the five international space treaties and five UN declarations. Approximately 100 nations and institutions were involved in negotiations.  The space treaties cover many major issues such as arms control, non-appropriation of space, freedom of exploration, liability for damages, safety and rescue of astronauts and spacecraft, prevention of harmful interference with space activities and the environment, notification and registration of space activities, and the settlement of disputes. In exchange for assurances from the space power, the nonspacefaring nations acquiesced to U.S. and Soviet proposals to treat outer space as a commons (res communis) territory which belonged to no one state.

Asteroid mining in particular is covered by both international treaties—for example, the Outer Space Treaty—and national statutory laws—for example, specific legislative acts in the United States and Luxembourg.

Varying degrees of criticism exist regarding international space law. Some critics accept the Outer Space Treaty, but reject the Moon Agreement. The Outer Space Treaty allows private property rights for outer space natural resources once removed from the surface, subsurface or subsoil of the Moon and other celestial bodies in outer space. Thus, international space law is capable of managing newly emerging space mining activities, private space transportation, commercial spaceports and commercial space stations/habitats/settlements. Space mining involving the extraction and removal of natural resources from their natural location is allowable under the Outer Space Treaty. Once removed, those natural resources can be reduced to possession, sold, traded and explored or used for scientific purposes. International space law allows space mining, specifically the extraction of natural resources. It is generally understood within the space law authorities that extracting space resources is allowable, even by private companies for profit. However, international space law prohibits property rights over territories and outer space land.

Astrophysicists Carl Sagan and Steven J. Ostro raised the concern altering the trajectories of asteroids near Earth might pose a collision hazard threat. They concluded that orbit engineering has both opportunities and dangers: if controls instituted on orbit-manipulation technology were too tight, future spacefaring could be hampered, but if they were too loose, human civilization would be at risk.

The Outer Space Treaty 
After ten years of negotiations between nearly 100 nations, the Outer Space Treaty opened for signature on January 27, 1966. It entered into force as the constitution for outer space on October 10, 1967.  The Outer Space Treaty was well received; it was ratified by ninety-six nations and signed by an additional twenty-seven states. The outcome has been that the basic foundation of international space law consists of five (arguably four) international space treaties, along with various written resolutions and declarations. The main international treaty is the Outer Space Treaty of 1967; it is generally viewed as the "Constitution" for outer space. By ratifying the Outer Space Treaty of 1967, ninety-eight nations agreed that outer space would belong to the "province of mankind", that all nations would have the freedom to "use" and "explore" outer space, and that both these provisions must be done in a way to "benefit all mankind". The province of mankind principle and the other key terms have not yet been specifically defined (Jasentuliyana, 1992). Critics have complained that the Outer Space Treaty is vague. Yet, international space law has worked well and has served space commercial industries and interests for many decades. The taking away and extraction of Moon rocks, for example, has been treated as being legally permissible.

The framers of Outer Space Treaty initially focused on solidifying broad terms first, with the intent to create more specific legal provisions later (Griffin, 1981: 733–734). This is why the members of the COPUOS later expanded the Outer Space Treaty norms by articulating more specific understandings which are found in the "three supplemental agreements" – the Rescue and Return Agreement of 1968, the Liability Convention of 1973, and the Registration Convention of 1976 (734).

Hobe (2007) explains that the Outer Space Treaty "explicitly and implicitly prohibits only the acquisition of territorial property rights" but extracting space resources is allowable. It is generally understood within the space law authorities that extracting space resources is allowable, even by private companies for profit. However, international space law prohibits property rights over territories and outer space land. Hobe further explains that there is no mention of “the question of the extraction of natural resources which means that such use is allowed under the Outer Space Treaty” (2007: 211). He also points out that there is an unsettled question regarding the division of benefits from outer space resources in accordance with Article, paragraph 1 of the Outer Space Treaty.

The Moon Agreement 

The Moon Agreement was signed on December 18, 1979, as part of the United Nations Charter and it entered into force in 1984 after a five state ratification consensus procedure, agreed upon by the members of the United Nations Committee on Peaceful Uses of Outer Space (COPUOS).  As of September 2019, only 18 nations have signed or ratified the treaty. The other three outer space treaties experienced a high level of international cooperation in terms of signage and ratification, but the Moon Treaty went further than them, by defining the Common Heritage concept in more detail and by imposing specific obligations on the parties engaged in the exploration and/or exploitation of outer space. The Moon Treaty explicitly designates the Moon and its natural resources as part of the Common Heritage of Mankind.

The Article 11 establishes that lunar resources are "not subject to national appropriation by claim of sovereignty, by means of use or occupation, or by any other means". However, exploitation of resources is suggested to be allowed if it is "governed by an international regime" (Article 11.5), but the rules of such regime have not yet been established. S. Neil Hosenball, the NASA General Counsel and chief US negotiator for the Moon Treaty, cautioned in 2018 that negotiation of the rules of the international regime should be delayed until the feasibility of exploitation of lunar resources has been established. 
 
The objection to the treaty by the spacefaring nations is held to be the requirement that extracted resources (and the technology used to that end) must be shared with other nations. The similar regime in the United Nations Convention on the Law of the Sea is believed to impede the development of such industries on the seabed.

The United States, the Russian Federation, and the People's Republic of China (PRC) have neither signed, acceded to, nor ratified the Moon Agreement.

Legal regimes of some countries

Luxembourg 
In February 2016, the Government of Luxembourg said that it would attempt to "jump-start an industrial sector to mine asteroid resources in space" by, among other things, creating a "legal framework" and regulatory incentives for companies involved in the industry.
In 2017, it became the "first European country to pass a law conferring to companies the ownership of any resources they extract from space", and remained active in advancing space resource public policy in 2018.

In 2017, Japan, Portugal, and the UAE entered into cooperation agreements with Luxembourg for mining operations in celestial bodies.

In 2018, the Luxembourg Space Agency was created. It provides private companies and organizations working on asteroid mining with financial support.

United States 
Some nations are beginning to promulgate legal regimes for extraterrestrial resource extraction.  For example, the United States "SPACE Act of 2015"—facilitating private development of space resources consistent with US international treaty obligations—passed the US House of Representatives in July 2015. In November 2015 it passed the United States Senate. On 25 November US-President Barack Obama signed the H.R.2262 – U.S. Commercial Space Launch Competitiveness Act into law. The law recognizes the right of U.S. citizens to own space resources they obtain and encourages the commercial exploration and utilization of resources from asteroids. According to the article § 51303 of the law:

On 6 April 2020 US-President Donald Trump signed the Executive Order on Encouraging International Support for the Recovery and Use of Space Resources. According to the Order:
 Americans should have the right to engage in commercial exploration, recovery, and use of resources in outer space
 the US does not view space as a "global commons"
 the US opposes the Moon Agreement

Environmental impact
A positive impact of asteroid mining has been conjectured as being an enabler of transferring industrial activities into space, such as energy generation. A quantitative analysis of the potential environmental benefits of water and platinum mining in space has been developed, where potentially large benefits could materialize, depending on the ratio of material mined in space and mass launched into space.

Research missions to asteroids and comets

Proposed or cancelled 
 Near Earth Asteroid Prospector -  concept for a small commercial spacecraft mission by the private company SpaceDev,  the project ran into fundraising difficulties and subsequently cancelled.

Ongoing and planned 
 Hayabusa2 – ongoing JAXA asteroid sample return mission (arrived at the target in 2018, returned sample in 2020)
 OSIRIS-REx – ongoing NASA asteroid sample return mission (launched in September 2016, arrived at target 2020, expected return 2023)
 Fobos-Grunt 2 – proposed Roskosmos sample return mission to Phobos (launch in 2024)
 VIPER rover – planned NASA mission to prospect for lunar resources in 2024

Completed 

First successful missions by country:

In fiction 

The first mention of asteroid mining in science fiction apparently came in Garrett P. Serviss' story Edison's Conquest of Mars, published in the New York Evening Journal in 1898. Several science-fiction video games include asteroid mining.

Gallery

See also

 Asteroid belt
 Asteroid capture
 Asteroid Redirect Mission
 Deep Space Industries
 In situ resource utilization
 Lunar resources
 Mining
 Mining the Sky: Untold Riches from the Asteroids, Comets, and Planets
 Near Earth Asteroid Prospector
 Planetary Resources Inc.
 TransAstra Corporation
 Sample-return mission
 Space manufacturing
 Space-based economy
 SpaceDev
 World Is Not Enough (spacecraft propulsion)

Notes

References

Publications
 Space Enterprise: Beyond NASA / David Gump (1990) .
 Mining the Sky: Untold Riches from the Asteroids, Comets, and Planets / John S. Lewis (1998) 
  
 Viorel Badescu: Asteroids – prospective energy and material resources. Springer, Berlin 2013, .
 Ram Jakhu, et al.: Space Mining and Its Regulation. Springer, Cham 2016, .
 Annette Froehlich: Space Resource Utilization: A View from an Emerging Space Faring Nation. Springer, Cham 2018, .

External links

Text
 The Technical and Economic Feasibility of Mining the Near-Earth Asteroids, M. J. Sonter.
 Michael Booth: The Future of Space Mining (December 21, 1995)
 The Plan to Bring an Asteroid to Earth
 How Asteroids can save mankind
 Luxembourg aims to be big player in possible asteroid mining, The Guardian, February 2016.

Video
 Video Beyond Earth – NEO Destinations  NewSpace Conference of the Space Frontier Foundation, Aug 7, 2011
 Video Moon, Mars, Asteroids – Where to Go First for Resources? Space manufacturing Conference of the Space Studies Institute, October 2010
 Video Moving An Asteroid California Institute of Technology, Workshop Public Lecture Panel, September 2011
 Video Asteroid Mining – The Market Problem and Radical Solution, November 2013

 
Mining in space
Mining techniques
Natural resources
Space law in the United States